Middlefield is a village in Middlefield Township, Geauga County, Ohio, United States. The population was 2,748 at the 2020 census. It is part of the Cleveland metropolitan area. Middlefield is known for being the center of the world's fourth largest Amish settlement, and its significant manufacturing base, which includes Gold Key Processing, Inc., Duncan Toys and KraftMaid. Because of its central location, home of the areas' public schools and prominent business and retail presence, Middlefield village is considered the hub community for Huntsburg, Parkman, and Middlefield Townships.

History

Once named "Batavia," the village received its current name because it was the midway point between Painesville and Warren.  Middlefield was established in 1799 by James Thompson and his father, Isaac Thompson, and incorporated in 1901.

Joseph Johnson settled north of Middlefield on what is now known as Johnson Corners in 1800. In 1818, James Thompson built a hotel. This hotel, later named The Century Inn, is currently the home of the Middlefield Historical Association. The Historical Association operates a small railroad museum in the summers, The Depot, focused on the 1873 narrow gauge railway between Painesville and Warren.

Middlefield's first manufacturing company was the Johnson Pail Company, founded in 1895.

The Middlefield Library, a branch of the Geauga County Public Library, was opened in 1942.

In 1965, the Ukrainian Scouting Organization, Plast, established its midwestern campground known as "Pysanyj Kamin" occupying over 150 acres at the easternmost end of Shedd Rd in Middlefield Township. Three-week summer camps draw hundreds of Ukrainian American campers from Chicago, Detroit, Cleveland, Philadelphia, Washington D.C., in addition to other North American cities and sometimes Ukraine.

Middlefield realizes more than 80% of its income tax from industrial and commercial  business, making this Geauga county's industrial capital. Businesses serving the area include both large and small entities such as Gold Key Processing, Inc., Good News Newspaper, Karl's Jewelry, KraftMaid (Masco) Cabinetry, Sajar Plastics, Mary Yoder's Amish Kitchen, Town Tavern, Middlefield Tavern, Middlefield Banking Company, Middlefield Cheese House, Inc., and Mercury Plastics, Inc.

In 2005, Wal-Mart opened a Supercenter in the village. In order to cater to the local Amish population, the Supercenter has an expanded parking lot that includes 37 hitching posts for Amish buggies, and the store is stocked with blocks of ice and fabrics for clothes to be made at home.

Geography

Demographics

Middlefield is the center of the world's fourth largest Amish settlement, but very few actually live within the Village limits.

2010 census
As of the census of 2010, there were 2,690 people, 1,186 households, and 678 families residing in the village. The racial makeup of the village was 96.9% White, 0.8% African American, 0.6% Asian, 0.1% from other races, and 1.6% from two or more races. Hispanic or Latino of any race were 0.8% of the population.

There were 1,186 households, of which 26.9% had children under the age of 18 living with them, 42.6% were married couples living together, 11.4% had a female householder with no husband present, 3.2% had a male householder with no wife present, and 42.8% were non-families. 37.9% of all households were made up of individuals, and 19.6% had someone living alone who was 65 years of age or older. The average household size was 2.20 and the average family size was 2.92.

The median age in the village was 43.8 years. 21.9% of residents were under the age of 18; 7.1% were between the ages of 18 and 24; 22.9% were from 25 to 44; 25.8% were from 45 to 64; and 22.5% were 65 years of age or older. The gender makeup of the village was 45.3% male and 54.7% female.

2000 census
As of the census of 2000, there were 2,233 people, 955 households, and 576 families residing in the village. The population density was 743.1 people per square mile (287.4/km2). There were 1,015 housing units at an average density of 337.8 per square mile (130.6/km2). The racial makeup of the village was 97.90% White, 0.85% African American, 0.18% Native American, 0.36% Asian, 0.09% from other races, and 0.63% from two or more races. Hispanic or Latino of any race were 0.54% of the population.

There were 955 households, out of which 29.9% had children under the age of 18 living with them, 45.5% were married couples living together, 11.5% had a female householder with no husband present, and 39.6% were non-families. 33.9% of all households were made up of individuals, and 16.6% had someone living alone who was 65 years of age or older. The average household size was 2.25 and the average family size was 2.90.

In the village, the population was spread out, with 23.6% under the age of 18, 8.2% from 18 to 24, 30.5% from 25 to 44, 19.7% from 45 to 64, and 18.1% who were 65 years of age or older. The median age was 37 years. For every 100 females there were 85.6 males. For every 100 females age 18 and over, there were 80.6 males.

The median income for a household in the village was $38,581, and the median income for a family was $47,500. Males had a median income of $35,898 versus $26,302 for females. The per capita income for the village was $19,400. About 6.5% of families and 9.0% of the population were below the poverty line, including 7.5% of those under age 18 and 13.0% of those age 65 or over.

Notable people
Franklin L. Gilson, Wisconsin politician and judge
Luther F. Gilson, Wisconsin politician and businessman
Matthew Justice, professional wrestler
David A. Lucht, fire safety advocate in government, academia, and the nonprofit sector
Wardlow, professional wrestler

References

External links

 Middlefield Chamber of Commerce

Villages in Geauga County, Ohio
1799 establishments in the Northwest Territory
Amish in Ohio
Populated places established in 1799
Villages in Ohio